Oshwe Airport  is an airport serving Oshwe, a town on the Lukenie River in Mai-Ndombe Province, Democratic Republic of the Congo. The runway is just west of the town.

See also

Transport in the Democratic Republic of the Congo
List of airports in the Democratic Republic of the Congo

References

External links
 OpenStreetMap - Oshwe
 OurAirports - Oshwe
 FallingRain - Oshwe
 

Airports in Mai-Ndombe Province